The Pepsi 420 was a NASCAR Winston Cup Series stock car race held at Fairgrounds Speedway from 1958 to 1984.

Past winners

1960, 1961, & 1968: Race shortened due to rain.
1963: Race shortened due to impending darkness.

Multiple winners (drivers)

Multiple winners (manufacturers)

References

External links
 

Former NASCAR races